The Cape Town trolleybus system was part of the public transport network in Cape Town, South Africa, for nearly 30 years in the mid-twentieth century.  The trolleybuses on the system were always referred to by English-speaking locals as "Trackless trams", and even the systems's stops were marked "Trackless Tram Stop".

See also

History of Cape Town

List of trolleybus systems

References

Further reading

External links

 Springbok Bus Roots: the Trackless Trams

Transport in Cape Town
Cape Town
Cape Town